is a private university in Kawasaki, Kanagawa, Japan. Its predecessor, a women's school, was founded in 1926. It was chartered as a women's junior college in 1967 and became coeducational in 1998. In 2002 the school became a four-year college.

External links
 Official website 

 

Educational institutions established in 1926
Private universities and colleges in Japan
Universities and colleges in Kanagawa Prefecture
Kawasaki, Kanagawa
Western Metropolitan Area University Association
1926 establishments in Japan